Jeff Dunas  (born October 23, 1954, Los Angeles, California) is an American photographer known for his portraits of musicians and entertainers.  Founder and publisher of photography magazines, he is also the founder and director of the Palm Springs Photo Festival. He is the father of actress Alexa Davalos and has Lithuanian-Jewish ancestry.

Photo books 
State of the Blues (Aperture 1998)
American Pictures (Konemann & Aperture 2002)
Up Close & Personal (Merrell 2003)

References

External links
 Jeff Dunas Official Homepage
 Palm Springs Photo Festival

1954 births
Living people
American photographers
American people of Lithuanian-Jewish descent